Petur Hliddal (born 1945) is an American sound engineer. He has been nominated for two Academy Awards in the category Best Sound. He has worked on more than 80 films since 1972.

Selected filmography
 Batman Forever (1995)
 The Aviator (2004)

References

External links

1945 births
Living people
American audio engineers
Daytime Emmy Award winners